Johnson Tan Han Seng v. Public Prosecutor [1977] 2 MLJ 66 is a Malaysian case concerning the lapsing of a Proclamation of Emergency by the Yang di-Pertuan Agong (King). The case was heard by the Federal Court, which unanimously held that the question of a Proclamation of Emergency's validity was political, not judicial, and as such the courts had no standing to decide the validity of a state of emergency.

Background
Article 150 of the Constitution permits the Agong, on the advice of the Prime Minister, to proclaim a state of emergency in the country. The Proclamation of Emergency may be revoked by either the Agong or by both houses of Parliament. Clause (7) specifies that the proclamation may also be terminated after the passage of six months from the date which the Proclamation of Emergency states it shall cease to be in force. However, no Proclamation of Emergency has ever specified such a date; therefore, the state of emergency would exist until Parliament or the Agong revoked it.

In 1969, the May 13 Incident of racial rioting in the federal capital, Kuala Lumpur, caused the Agong to proclaim a nationwide emergency on May 15 of that year. During the period of emergency, the Agong promulgated a number of ordinances by way of the legislative powers granted to him through the Constitution. These legislative powers were only valid during the state of emergency, but the ordinances issued would persist after the emergency unless repealed by Parliament. One ordinance promulgated during the period of emergency in 1969 was the Emergency (Essential Powers) Ordinance No. 1.

In 1975, the Agong, who had been granted further legislative powers by the Emergency (Essential Powers) Ordinance, promulgated the Essential (Special Cases) Regulations 1975 (ESCAR). ESCAR provides for special rules governing trials classified as security cases — these rules, among other things, permit witnesses to give evidence in camera, forbid a jury trial, and mandate the maximum permissible sentence for a crime if the accused is found guilty.

Tan was tried under ESCAR, but challenged ESCAR's applicability on the grounds that there was no state of emergency in 1975, when ESCAR was promulgated. His argument was that the state of emergency in 1969 had long ceased to exist, rendering the Proclamation of Emergency irrelevant and of no effect — and thereby rendering ESCAR null and void.

Decision

The judges of the Federal Court who heard the case — Lord President of the Federal Court Mohamed Suffian Mohamed Hashim, Federal Justice Wan Sulaiman and Federal Justice Raja Azlan Shah — unanimously held that the question was a "political" and not a judicial one. Lord President Suffian cited as persuasive precedent the decision of Justice Krishna Iyer in the Indian case Bhutnath v. State of West Bengal, where Iyer stated:

Legacy

The decision in Johnson Tan reaffirmed that of Public Prosecutor v. Khong Teng Khen & Anor., a 1976 case where ESCAR's constitutionality had been challenged on similar grounds. In that case, Federal Justice Wan Sulaiman had held:

Despite the judgements in these two cases, in 1978, the Judicial Committee of the Privy Council overruled Khong Teng Khen by ruling in Teng Cheng Poh v. Public Prosecutor that ESCAR was ultra vires (in contravention of) the Constitution. Despite this, ESCAR was later revived by Parliament as part of the Emergency (Essential Powers) Act (EEPA).

Legal scholars have disapproved of the judgment in Johnson Tan, arguing that:

Those critical of Johnson Tan cite the 1976 case of Cheah Soon Hoong v. Public Prosecutor, where an inferior court had held that the 1969 Proclamation of Emergency had lapsed, and also the non-binding obiter dictum of Lord Reid in the British case of Re Earl of Antrim and Eleven Other Irish Peers, where Lord Reid held:

Despite these criticisms, under the legal principle of stare decisis, Johnson Tan remains binding law in Malaysia, allowing a Proclamation of Emergency to remain in force after the circumstances it was meant for have expired.

See also
Public Prosecutor v. Khong Teng Khen & Anor.

Notes and references

Malaysian case law
1977 in case law
1977 in Malaysia